Negrei may refer to
Several species of beetles, including
Blennidus negrei 
Metius negrei 
Mecyclothorax negrei
Stenotsivoka negrei
Ion Negrei (born 1958), Moldovan politician
Pârâul Negrei, a tributary of the Moldova River in Romania